Brown v Heathcote County Council [1986] 1 NZLR 76 is a cited case in New Zealand regarding council liability for negligent inspection.

Background
The Browns planned to build a new house on the family orchard, on the banks of the Heathcote River.

This river had a history of flooding, and the local council sought advice from the Christchurch Drainage Board about the suitability of the proposed building site, and they advised that elevating the building site by 9 inches would be adequate flood protection, and the council duly issued a building consent, subject to this condition.

The House was built and completed in 1974. However, the site was flooded in 1975, 1976 and 1977 and as a result of these repeated floodings, the Browns raised the elevation of the house by 6 feet, at the cost of $30,000.

After the council and the drainage board refused to reimburse them the $30,000, the Browns sued them in tort, winning damages in the High Court of $32,900.

Held
The Court of Appeal ruled that the council was liable. This decision was later affirmed by the Privy Council.

Footnote: The Court of Appeal decided Brown v Heathcote County Council on the same day as Craig v East Coast Bays City Council and Stieller v Porirua City Council, which also involved negligent council building inspections.

References

Court of Appeal of New Zealand cases
1986 in case law
1986 in New Zealand law